Lozotaenia costinotana is a species of moth of the family Tortricidae. It is found in North America, where it has been recorded from Maine, Manitoba, Minnesota and Quebec.

The wingspan is 18–23 mm. The forewings are grey white, but whitest along the costa and outer margin. There is a pattern of blackish-brown transverse lines, as well as a black costal spot. The hindwings are white, the inner margin and apical area with brownish-black scales. Adults have been recorded on wing from July to August.

References

	

Moths described in 1986
Archipini